Prince Paolo Petrovich Troubetzkoy (also known as Pavel or Paul; ; Intra, Italy, 15 February 1866 — Pallanza, 12 February 1938) was an artist and a sculptor who was described by George Bernard Shaw as "the most astonishing sculptor of modern times". By birth, he was a member of the ancient House of Trubetskoy.

Life
He was the son of Russian diplomat, Prince Peter Petrovich Troubetzkoy and his second wife, lyric singer Ada Winans (1831-1917). His paternal grandmother was Princess Emilie zu Sayn-Wittgenstein-Sayn (1801-1869), which makes him great-grandson of famous Marshal Prince Peter zu Sayn-Wittgenstein-Berleburg-Ludwigsburg. He worked in Russia, the United States, England and Italy. He was a self-taught artist, although he learned sculpture from Giuseppe Grandi. He is associated with impressionism, due to his ability to grasp sketchy movements in his bronze works. He was heavily influenced by the work of Auguste Rodin and Medardo Rosso.  He depicted the society of the Belle Époque. Few of his bronzes are still available in the market. Quite famous is the 35 cm high portrait of Constance Stewart-Richardson called "The Dancer". His work was also part of the sculpture event in the art competition at the 1912 Summer Olympics.

The largest and best known of his works is the monumental equestrian statue of the Russian Tsar Alexander III in St. Petersburg, Russia. The monument was opened in 1909 on the Nevsky Prospekt near the Moskovsky Vokzal terminal. After the Russian revolution of 1917, the Soviet government removed the monument from the main street to the rear of the Russian Museum in St. Petersburg. After the dissolution of the Soviet Union, in 1994, the monument to Alexander was placed in front of the Marble Palace near the embankment of the Neva river, at the former site of the armoured car that transported Lenin from Finland Station.

Vegetarianism
Troubetzkoy was a vegetarian. His vegetarian friend George Bernard Shaw remarked: “Troubetzkoy is a gigantic and terrifying humanitarian who can do anything with an animal except eat it”.

Alexandra Tolstoy, daughter of the great novelist Leo Tolstoy wrote in her father’s biography: "From time to time he posed – a tiring obligation – for painters and sculptors: for Repin, Pasternak who did a study of the family, Aronson, and Paolo Troubetzkoy. Troubetzkoy, a Russian educated in Italy, did some splendid little statues of Tolstoy – one of him on horseback. Father was very fond of him. A sweet and childlike person in addition to his great gifts, he read practically nothing, spoke little, all his life was wrapped up in sculpture. As a convinced vegetarian he would not eat meat but cried: "Je ne mange pas de cadavre!" if anyone offered him some. In his studio in St. Petersburg there was a whole zoo: a bear, a fox, a horse, and a vegetarian wolf.

Troubetzkoy once said “As I cannot kill I cannot authorize others to kill. Do you see? If you are buying from a butcher you are authorizing him to kill — kill helpless, dumb creatures, which neither I nor you could kill ourselves.”

Personal life

Troubetzkoy was married twice.  His first marriage was to a Swedish woman, Elin Sundström (1883–1927) and his second marriage was to a British woman named Muriel Marie Boddam.  His son Pierre died at the age of 2 1/2 years - he sculpted in the same year the sculpture "Maternity".

Gallery

Expositions 

Paris Expo 1900 (gran premio). In: AIC
De Young Museum (bust of Michael de Young)
 Biennale di Venezia 1922. (37 works).
 Galleria Nazionale (Rome)
 WWAA 1938

The Troubetzkoy Archive Project 
The Troubetzkoy Archive Project provides a central database for the works of Paul Troubetzkoy. It was created by James Drake on behalf of the Museo del Paesaggio.

See also 

Troubetzkoy

References

Further reading

External links 

Paolo Troubetzkoy, images by Google
Paolo Troubetzkoy exhibition catalog

1866 births
1938 deaths
19th-century sculptors from the Russian Empire
19th-century male artists from the Russian Empire
20th-century Russian sculptors
20th-century male artists
People from Intra
Russian male sculptors
Paolo
Vegetarianism activists
Olympic competitors in art competitions